Countess Hélène de Pourtalès (April 28, 1868 – November 2, 1945), born Helen Barbey, was an American-born sailor who competed in the 1900 Summer Olympics representing Switzerland and became the first woman to win an Olympic gold medal. She was also the first woman to represent Switzerland at the Olympics.

Early life
Helen Barbey was born on April 28, 1868, in New York City, the daughter of Henry Isaac Barbey and Mary (née Lorillard) Barbey.  Her maternal grandparents were Pierre Lorillard III and Catherine Anne ( Griswold) Lorillard. Her sister Eva was married to André Poupart, Baron de Neuflize in 1903, the older brother of Roberte Ponsonby, Countess of Bessborough. Her father, a financier and a director of the Buffalo, Rochester and Pittsburgh Railway, was a nephew of Adrian Georg Iselin and cousin of Charles Oliver Iselin.

Barbey grew up at 17 West 38th Street in New York City.

Career
De Pourtalès was a crewmember of the Swiss boat Lérina, which won the gold medal in the first race of 1–2 ton class and silver medal in the second race of 1–2 ton class. She also participated in the open class but did not finish. Her husband Hermann, as helmsman, and her husband's nephew Bernard were also crew members. De Pourtalès was also one of the first women to take part in the Olympics, as that was the first time women were allowed to compete. She was very well known after her gold medal, becoming the first woman to win a gold medal two months before Charlotte Cooper.

Personal life
On 25 April 1891, de Pourtalès was married to Hermann Alexander, Count von Pourtalès (1847–1904), after the death of his first wife, Marguerite Marcet. Hermann was a captain of the Cuirassiers of the Guard.

From his first marriage, de Pourtalès became the stepmother of Count Guy de Pourtalès (1881–1941), the author, and Count Raimond Pourtalès (1882–1914), attache of the German embassy, who married Countess Luise Alexandra von Bernstorff (1888–1971), daughter of Johann Heinrich von Bernstorff, the German Ambassador to the United States in 1911.  The wedding, which took place in Washington, D.C. was attended by William Howard Taft, who was then the President of the United States.  After his death in 1914, his widow Luise Alexandra remarried to Prince Johannes Baptista of Löwenstein-Wertheim-Rosenberg (1880–1956), the youngest son of Charles, 6th Prince of Löwenstein-Wertheim-Rosenberg.

De Pourtalès died on November 2, 1945, in Geneva.

References

Further reading

External links

1868 births
1945 deaths
Sportspeople from New York City
Swiss female sailors (sport)
Sailors at the 1900 Summer Olympics – 1 to 2 ton
Olympic sailors of Switzerland
Olympic gold medalists for Switzerland
Olympic silver medalists for Switzerland
Swiss sportswomen
Medalists at the 1900 Summer Olympics
Pourtalès family
Olympic medalists in sailing
Sailors at the 1900 Summer Olympics – Open class
American emigrants to Switzerland